Adult Contemporary is a chart published by Billboard ranking the top-performing songs in the United States in the adult contemporary music (AC) market.  First published in 1961, the listing was compiled until 1965 by simply extracting from the magazine's all-genre chart, the Hot 100, those songs which were deemed of an appropriate style and ranking them according to their placings on the Hot 100.  In 1963, during which the chart was published under the title Middle-Road Singles, 14 different songs topped the chart in 52 issues of the magazine.

At the start of the year, Steve Lawrence held the number one position with "Go Away Little Girl", which stayed in the top spot through the issue of Billboard dated January 19 before it was replaced by "Walk Right In" by The Rooftop Singers.  Only one act had more than one number one hit during the year: folk trio Peter, Paul and Mary spent two weeks at the top of the chart in May with "Puff, the Magic Dragon" and a further five weeks at number one in August with "Blowin' in the Wind".  The latter song was replaced in the top spot by the longest-running Middle Road chart-topper of the year, "Blue Velvet" by Bobby Vinton, which spent eight consecutive weeks at number one.  Vinton thus also had the highest total number of weeks at number one by any artist.

A number of acts who topped the Middle Road chart in 1963 never reached number one on the Hot 100, including The Cascades, Skeeter Davis, Rolf Harris, and The Village Stompers.  Neither Al Martino or Andy Williams ever topped the Hot 100, but both reached number one on the Most Played by Jockeys chart, one of the multiple all-genres charts which Billboard published prior to the creation of the Hot 100 in 1958.  The success of the Cascades was short-lived, and the group achieved the unusual feat of topping the Middle-Road chart with the only one of their songs ever to appear on the listing.  This feat was also achieved by Belgian vocalist The Singing Nun, who had the final Middle-Road number one of 1963 with "Dominique".  Although it also topped the Hot 100, it was the only song which The Singing Nun, also known as Soeur Sourire (Sister Smile), placed on any Billboard chart during her brief commercial career.

Chart history

References

See also
1963 in music
List of artists who reached number one on the U.S. Adult Contemporary chart

1963
1963 record charts